After Sundown is a 1911 Australian film directed by W. J. Lincoln set in the Australian bush.

According to Lincoln's obituary in The Bulletin it was one of Lincoln's best films.

Only six minutes of the film survive today.

Plot
Two men fight over the same woman. The villain taunts the hero with the fact he has won her, until an old man appears and shoots the villain dead. It turns out the old man was the father of a girl "ruined" by the villain.

Cast
Leslie Woods as Gilbert Baxter
Godfrey Cass as Western Moore

Production
The film was based on a one-act 1896 play by W.J. Lincoln. According to a press account the aim was to "realise the ideal of a bush story which shall be true to actual life in Australia, sweet and natural in its atmosphere, dealing with type of chnracter which are to be found in the wayback country."

It was a film from Amalgamated Pictures and was shot in September 1911 at their studios in St Kilda as well as on location at Healesville, outside Melbourne, and Coranderrk Mission Station.

Reception
The film was never released.

References

External links
Extensive 1911 newspaper article on the making of the film

1911 films
Australian black-and-white films
Australian silent feature films
Lost Australian films
1911 lost films
Unreleased films
Films directed by W. J. Lincoln